Josh Wingate is an American actor best known for his recurring role as Carter on the ABC daytime series  General Hospital.  His storyline made history as the first time a soap opera had addressed the taboo topic of male survivors of sexual violence. In 2011, Wingate won a TV Guide Canada Soap Opera Spirit Award nomination for Outstanding Male Actor in a Recurring Role.

Wingate has guest starred on several primetime series including: Justified, Castle, How I Met Your Mother, Sons of Anarchy and CSI: NY.

In 2011, he played the character Familiar in the feature film Priest starring Paul Bettany.  Wingate appeared in director Marc Forster's World War Z, starring Brad Pitt, and the indie feature Inverse.

Wingate was raised in Massachusetts and started acting at age 15, eventually performing in several local and regional productions before moving to Los Angeles to pursue a career in film and television.

References 

Year of birth missing (living people)
Living people
American male television actors
Male actors from Massachusetts